Kuura may refer to several places in Estonia:
Kuura, Lääne-Viru County, village in Estonia
Kuura, Võru County, village in Estonia
Kuura River, river in Estonia